Polisport Group is a Portuguese brand known for its development and manufacturing of motorcycle accessories and bicycle accessories.

History 
Polisport, headquartered in Portugal, was established in 1978 by Pedro Araújo.

The Polisport Group is made up of five international companies namely; Polisport Plásticos S.A., Polinter Plásticos S.A., Polisport Molds LDA, Headgy Helmets, and Polistar LTDA.

In late 2013, Polisport Group acquired the brand Bobike – Bicycle Safety Seats, a Dutch company and former competitor.

Products and services 
Polisport  manufactures and distributes  motorcycle and bicycle accessories including child bicycle seats, helmets, handguards, headlights, body protectors, dirtbike body plastics and other related accessories. The Group sells majority of its output to foreign markets as well as being a key supplier for many OEM (original equipment manufacture) brands such as KTM, BMW, Suzuki, Decathlon, Husqvarna and Gas Gas.

Awards and recognitions 
 2011 – Won two IF Design Awards: Product Design for Guppy bicycle baby seat and Material Design for Corky bicycle water bottle

See also 
 Motorcycle components
 Motorcycle personal protective equipment

References 

Manufacturing companies established in 1978
Manufacturing companies of Portugal
1978 establishments in Portugal